An entourage is an informal group or band of people who are closely associated with a (usually) famous, notorious, or otherwise notable individual. The word can also refer to:

Arts and entertainment
 L'entourage, French hip hop / rap collective
 "Entourage" (song), a 2006 single from Omarion
 Entourage (American TV series), a 2004 HBO series
 "Entourage" (episode), the pilot episode of the American comedy-drama television series Entourage
 Entourage (film), a 2015 film adaptation of the HBO television series
 Entourage (South Korean TV series), a 2016 South Korean TV series and remake of the American series.
 The Entourage Music and Theater Ensemble, an ambient music group

Technology and computing
 Entourage 2004, the email client from Office 2004 for Mac, a version of Microsoft Office developed for Mac OS X operating system
 enTourage eDGe, dual panel personal device
 Microsoft Entourage, a personal information manager for Mac OS X

Other uses
 Entourage (topology), a term used in the mathematical field of topology
 Hyundai Entourage, a minivan built by Hyundai Motor Company
 Entourage effect, the simultaneous synergetic effect of multiple cannabinoids and terpenes in Cannabis